Bistupur  is a suburb and business district. Bistupur is one of the major commercial areas of Jamshedpur in Jharkhand, India. It is one of the oldest places in Jamshedpur with several historical landmarks and heritage buildings.

History 
During the establishment of Jamshedpur this area was established. This place was a commercial area. During the time of the British, The Regal Building was built. It is one of the oldest buildings in Jamshedpur. It is now a shopping mall. Other historical buildings in Bistupur include Muslim Library, Tata Steel Gate, Bistupur Masjid, Tata Steel Guest House and Circuit House. During World War II, troops came to stay at Circuit House.

Civic administration
There is a police station at Bistupur.

Education 
 Jamshedpur Women's College

Buildings 
Here are many buildings including:

 Bhadani Trade Centre
 Astha Trade  Centre
 LIC Building
 Gayatri Enclave
 Bistupur Market
 Ginger Hotels

Tourist attractions 
 Regal Building
 Circuit House
 Millennium Park
 P&M Hi-Tech City Centre Mall
 Bistupur Masjid
 Muslim Library
 Tata Steel Gate

Landmarks and gallery

See also
 Adityapur
 Jugsalai
 Kadma
 List of neighbourhoods of Jamshedpur

References

Jamshedpur
Central business districts in India
Neighbourhoods in Jamshedpur